Tokyo Mosque,  also known as Tokyo Camii (pronounced Jamii), is a mosque with an adjoining Turkish culture center located in the Ōyama-chō district of Shibuya ward in Tokyo, Japan. It is the largest mosque in Japan. 

Originally built in 1938, the current building was completed in 2000. It was designed by Hilmi Şenalp, in a style inspired by Ottoman architecture.

History 
The mosque was originally built along with an adjoining school on May 12, 1938 by Bashkir and Tatar immigrants from Russia who had come to Japan after the October Revolution. It was made under the direction of Abdurreshid Ibrahim, the first Imam of the mosque, and Abdülhay Kurban Ali.

In 1986, the mosque had to be demolished because of severe structural damage. Under the direction and support of Turkey’s Directorate of Religious Affairs, a new building was begun in 1998. The architect for the building was Hilmi Şenalp. The ornamentation was based on Ottoman religious architecture. Around 70 Turkish craftsmen performed the finishing details, and a considerable quantity of marble was imported from Turkey. The construction was completed in 2000 at a cost of around 1.5 billion yen.  The inauguration was held on June 30, 2000.

Description 
Tokyo Mosque is 734 square meters in area and has one basement floor and three above-ground floors with a total floor area of 1,477 square meters. Its main dome is 23.25 meters tall and is supported by six pillars, while the adjacent minaret is 41.48 meters tall.

Each floor of the building houses a different activity for worshipers at that mosque. The first floor is a common area, the second floor is the prayer room, housing the mihrab, and a minbar, elevated steps for the imam to deliver the sermon.

Color Depicted In Ottoman Mosques 
All throughout the interior and exterior of the Tokyo Mosque the colors white, and turquoise are heavily used. Since this mosque is modeled after Ottoman architecture the colors that are utilized are reflected throughout this structure and the use of the colors implemented are reciprocated as well. The color turquoise is a color that is regarded to be a representation of holiness, a color depicted as early as ancient Iran. The minbar and mihrab are both covered in white marble, a color that most known to represent purity in relation to God and pure light, while the gold detailing on both of the functional ornaments allows the pieces to further stand out in the mosque.

This structure also heavily resembles another mosque created under the same Ottoman architecture style, the Blue Mosque. Color within these mosques are highlighted through their use of natural and artificial lighting, natural via the many windows that encompass the mosque and artificial via the low hanging chandeliers. The connection between the use of light and color to an audience is known and utilized throughout the creation of mosques, as the architects try and incorporate enough of each to create an impact on the viewer of the building.

Gallery

Notes
The word camii is a Turkish word derived from the Arabic word jami which means 'congregational mosque.'

See also
Fukuoka Mosque
Kobe Mosque
Islam
Islam in Japan
List of mosques in Asia
Religion in Japan

References

External links

Official Website - English, Japanese and Turkish.
Information about the building - Japanese

Bashkir diaspora
Mosques in Tokyo
Russian diaspora in Asia
Tatar diaspora
Turkish diaspora in Asia
Mosques completed in 1938
Japan–Turkey relations
Volga Tatar diaspora
Buildings and structures in Shibuya